Cerace tonkinana is a species of moth of the family Tortricidae. It is found in Vietnam.

References

Moths described in 2010
Ceracini